The 2003 Rhein Fire season was the ninth season for the franchise in the NFL Europe League (NFLEL). The team was led by head coach Pete Kuharchek in his third year, and played its home games at Arena AufSchalke in Gelsenkirchen, Germany. They finished the regular season in second place with a record of six wins and four losses. In World Bowl XI, Rhein lost to the Frankfurt Galaxy 35–16.

Offseason

Free agent draft

Personnel

Staff

Roster

Schedule

Standings

Game summaries

World Bowl XI

Notes

References

Rhein
Rhein Fire seasons
Rhein
Rhein